Furcillaria is a genus of flat-backed millipedes in the family Xystodesmidae. There are at least four described species in Furcillaria.

Species
These four species belong to the genus Furcillaria:
 Furcillaria aequalis Shelley, 1981
 Furcillaria convoluta Shelley, 1981
 Furcillaria laminata Shelley, 1981
 Furcillaria thrinax (Shelley, 1982)

References

Further reading

 
 

Polydesmida
Articles created by Qbugbot